Chris Hillman is an American musician and songwriter. In addition to his solo albums and his recordings with the Byrds, the Flying Burrito Brothers, and the Desert Rose Band, he has been featured as a collaborator with and composer for many other artists.

Solo recordings
{| class="wikitable plainrowheaders" style="text-align:center;"
|-
! rowspan="2" style="width:8em;"| Title
! rowspan="2" style="width:18em;"| Album details
! colspan="4"| Peak chart positions
! rowspan="2" style="width:9em;"| Sales
|- style="font-size:smaller;"
! style="width:4em;"| US
! style="width:4em;"| US Country
! style="width:4em;"| US Folk
! style="width:4em;"| US Bluegrass
|-
! scope="row"| Slippin' Away
|
 Release date:  1976
 Label: Asylum
| 152
| —
| —
| —
|
|-
! scope="row"| Clear Sailin'''
|
 Release date: 1977
 Label: Asylum
| 188
| —
| —
| —
|
|-
! scope="row"| Morning Sky|
 Release date: 1982
 Label: Sugar Hill
| —
| —
| —
| —
|
|-
! scope="row"| Desert Rose|
 Release date: 1984
 Label: Sugar Hill
| —
| —
| —
| —
|
|-
! scope="row"| Like a Hurricane 
|
 Release date: 1998
 Label: Sugar Hill
| —
| —
| —
| —
|
|-
! scope="row"| The Other Side|
 Release date: June 21, 2005
 Label: Cooking Vinyl / Sovereign
| —
| —
| —
| 9
|
|-
! scope="row"| Bidin' My Time|
 Release date: September 22, 2017
 Label: Rounder
| 152
| 37
| 14
| 2
|
 US: 9,100
|-
| colspan="9" style="font-size:8pt"| "—" denotes releases that did not chart
|}

Singles
 1976: "Love Is The Sweetest Amnesty" / "Falling Again" (Asylum)
 1976: "Step On Out" / "Take It On the Run" (Asylum)
 1977: "Heartbreaker" / "Lucky In Love" (Asylum)
 1977: "Slippin' Away" / "Take me in your Lifeboat" (Asylum)
 1980: "Turn Your Radio On" (Capitol) with Roger McGuinn
 1980: "Love Me Tonight" (Capitol) with Roger McGuinn
 1984: "Somebody's Back In Town" / "Desert Rose" (Sugar Hill)
 1989: "You Ain't Going Nowhere" / "Don't You Hear Jerusalem Moan" (Universal) with Roger McGuinn and Nitty Gritty Dirt Band
 2005: "Eight Miles High" / "True Love" / "Drifting (Cooking Vinyl)

As a member of the Scottsville Squirrel Barkers
 1963: The Scottsville Squirrel Barkers Blue Grass Favorites (Crown)

As a member of the Hillmen
 1969: The Hillmen The Hillmen (Together)

As a member of the Byrds
 1964: Pre-Flyte Sessions (Together) first released in 1969
 1965: Mr. Tambourine Man (Columbia)
 1965: Turn! Turn! Turn! (Columbia)
 1966: Fifth Dimension (Columbia)
 1967: Younger Than Yesterday (Columbia)
1967: The Byrds' Greatest Hits (Columbia) - US: Platinum
 1968: The Notorious Byrd Brothers (Columbia)
 1968: Sweetheart of the Rodeo (Columbia)
 1973: Byrds (Asylum)

As a member of the Flying Burrito Brothers
 1969: The Gilded Palace of Sin (A&M)
 1970: Burrito Deluxe (A&M)
 1971: The Flying Burrito Brothers (A&M)
 1972: Last of the Red Hot Burritos (A&M)
 1974: Close Up the Honky Tonks (A&M)
 1974: Honky Tonk Heaven (Ariola)
 1976: Sleepless Nights (A&M)
 1988: Farther Along  (A&M)
 1987: Dim Lights, Thick Smoke, and Loud, Loud Music (Edsel)
 1996: Out of the Blue (A&M)

As a member of Manassas
Albums
 1972: Manassas (Atlantic) - US:Gold
 1973: Down the Road (Atlantic)
Compilations
 2009: Pieces (Rhino) alternate takes and outtakes

As a member of the Souther–Hillman–Furay Band
 1974: The Souther Hillman Furay Band (Asylum) - US: Gold
 1975: Trouble in Paradise (Asylum)

As a member of McGuinn, Clark & Hillman
Albums
 1979: McGuinn, Clark & Hillman (Capitol)
 1980: City (Capitol)
 1977: Three Byrds Land in London (Windsong / Strange Fruit) BBC live recordings
Compilations 
 1992: Return Flight I (Edsel)
 1993: Return Flight II (Edsel)
 2007; The Capitol Collection (Capitol)

With Roger McGuinn
 1980: McGuinn / Hillman (Capitol)

With Down Home Praise
 1983: Down Home Praise (Maranatha! Music)

With Ever Call Ready
 1985: Ever Call Ready (Maranatha!) with Al Perkins, Bernie Leadon, David Mansfield, and Jerry Scheff

As a member of the Desert Rose Band
Albums
 1987: The Desert Rose Band (Curb / MCA)
 1988: Running (Curb / MCA)
 1990: Pages of Life (Curb / MCA)
 1991: True Love (Curb / MCA)
 1993: Life Goes On (Curb)
Compilations
 1991: A Dozen Roses – Greatest Hits (MCA)

With Herb Pedersen
 1996: Bakersfield Bound (Sugar Hill)
 2003: Way Out West (Back Porch)
 2010: At Edwards Barn (Rounder)

With Larry Rice, Tony Rice, and Herb Pedersen
 1997: Out of the Woodwork (Rounder)
 1999: Rice, Rice, Hillman & Pedersen (Rounder)
 2001: Running Wild'' (Rounder)

References

External links
 Official homepage
 
 

Discographies of American artists
Rock music discographies
Country music discographies
Folk music discographies